George Harold Douglas (18 August 1893 – 1979) was an English professional association footballer who played as a winger. He played over 300 matches and scored 23 goals in the Football League. He moved into non-league football in 1928 as player/manager of Tunbridge Wells Rangers until 1930, when he moved to Dover United.

References

1893 births
1979 deaths
Footballers from Stepney
English footballers
Association football midfielders
Leicester City F.C. players
Burnley F.C. players
Tunbridge Wells F.C. players
Oldham Athletic A.F.C. players
Bristol Rovers F.C. players
English Football League players